The FIS Nordic Junior and U23 World Ski Championships 2007 took place in Planica, Slovenia and Tarvisio, Italy from 12 March to 18 March 2007. It was the 30th Junior World Championships and the second Under-23 World Championships in nordic skiing. Cross-country skiing and nordic combined events were held in Tarvisio, while the ski jumping events were held in Planica.

Medal summary

Junior events

Cross-country skiing

Nordic Combined

Ski jumping

Under-23 events

Cross-country skiing

Medal tables

All events

Junior events

Under-23 events

References 

2007
2007 in cross-country skiing
2007 in ski jumping
Junior World Ski Championships
2007 in youth sport
International sports competitions hosted by Italy
International sports competitions hosted by Slovenia